Vicki Barr is a popular mystery series for girls published by Grosset & Dunlap from 1947 to 1964.  Helen Wells (1910–1986) wrote volumes #1-4 and 9-16, and Julie Campbell Tatham (1908–1999), the creator of Trixie Belden, wrote volumes #5-8.

List of titles

See also

Stratemeyer Syndicate

External links 
Vicki Barr, Flight Stewardess

Book series introduced in 1947
Juvenile series
American novel series
American mystery novels
Aviation novels
Children's mystery novels